Lafia is a commune of the Cercle of Timbuktu in the Tombouctou Region of Mali. The administrative center (chef-lieu) is the village of Aglal.

References

External links
.

Communes of Tombouctou Region